The Chess Classics were chess tournaments initiated by Hans-Walter Schmitt, they were organized in the years 1994 to 2010. Among other things, the world champions in rapid chess and - also under rapid chess time control - the world champion in Chess960 and the computer Chess960 world champion were determined.

Overview 
The Chess Classic took place a total of seventeen times, seven times in Frankfurt am Main (1994 to 2000) and ten times in Mainz, . In Mainz the Chess Classic (abbreviated to CCM) was played in the Rheingoldhalle. Hans-Walter Schmitt managed to find sponsorship from Jens Beutel, Lord Mayor of Mainz, and he became patron of the event.
There were different events such as the Chess Classic Championship, Quick Chess Open, Chess960 Rapid Chess World Championships, FiNet Open in Chess960 and Chess960 Computer World Championship. In addition, 13 duels against machine (rapid chess and Chess960) and 26 simultaneous sessions (including Chess960) were conducted.

Pocket Fritz (A chess computer) was created in 2001 in the Rheingoldhalle Mainz.
in 2002  Jens Beutel played against Viswanathan Anand on the stage in the Rheingoldhalle, they were both using Pocket Fritz as computer assistance.

Chess Classic Championship

Rapid Chess Open

Chess960 Rapid chess World Championship

FiNet Open Chess960

Mini-Ordix und Mini-FiNet Open 

In the years 2007 to 2009 special talent tournaments took place for the children. These were three Mini Ordix Open and three Mini FiNet Open: 2009 seven rounds with separate scoring in 5 age groups (U16, U14, U12, U10 and U8), and in 2008 and 2007 six rounds each with separate scoring for 4 age groups ( U14, U12, U10 and U8).

1. Mini ORDIX Open U14 (2007) 
Final score after 6 rounds with 107 participants: Constantin Göbel, Ramil Babayev and Anna Endress. Best in the age groups were: Anna Endress (U14), Constantin Göbel (U12), Stephan Hansch (U10) and Björn-Benny Bauer (U8).

1. Mini FiNet Open U14 (2007) Final score after 6 rounds with 35 participants: Anna Endress, Alexander Jussupow and Constantin Göbel. Best in the age groups were: Anna Endress (U14), Constantin Göbel (U12), Stephan Hansch (U10) and Björn-Benny Bauer (U8).

2. Mini ORDIX Open U14 (2008) Final stage after 6 rounds with 104 participants: Dennis Wagner, Joshua Aarash Hager and Johannes Carow. Best in the age groups were: Joshua Aarash Hager (U14), Dennis Wagner (U12), Alexander Donchenko (U10) and Elias Müller (U8).

2. Mini FiNet Open U14 (2008) Final score after 6 rounds with 26 participants: Sebastian Kaphle, Carlo Pauly and Frederik Eigemann. Best in the age groups were: Sebastian Kaphle (U14), Frederik Eigemann (U12), Alexej Paulsen (U10) and Pascal Karsay (U8).

3. Mini ORDIX Open U16 (2009) Final score after 7 rounds with 72 participants: Alexander Donchenko, Dominik Will and Frederik Eigemann. Best in the age groups were: Matthias Eimer (U16), Dominik Will (U14), Alexander Donchenko (U12), Robert Baskin (U10) and Samuel Weber (U8).

3. Mini FiNet Open U16 (2009) Final score after 6 rounds with 32 participants: Johannes Carow, Carlo Pauly and Frederik Eigemann. Best in the age groups were: Achim Bluhm (U16), Johannes Carow (U14), Sonja Maria Bluhm (U12), Robert Baskin (U10) and Elias Müller (U8).

Chess960 Computer World Championship 

As the highlight of the different show battles between humans and computers and humans versus computers, the Chess960 Computer World Championships in Mainz were held from 2005 to 2009.

Further reading 
 Jussupow, Fietz, Metz: Premiere der Top Ten. Edition FCC, 
 KARL (Hrsg. Harry Schaack): Das Kulturelle Schachmagazin, Heft 2/2011, Schwerpunkt: Chess Classic auf den Seiten 3 bis 49, 
 Frankfurter Chess Classic 1996 in der Stadthalle Ffm-Zeilsheim, 28.-30. Juni 1996. SCHACH 96/3, S. 36
 Frankfurter Chess Classic 1998. SCHACH 1998, Heft 7, Seiten 4 bis 15
 Frankfurter Chess Classic 1999. SCHACH 1999, Heft 8, Seiten 5 bis 28
 Hans-Walter Schmitt: Chess Classic Mainz 2009. Rochade Europa, Nr. 5, S. 5/7
 Oliver Brendel: Chess Classic Mainz. SCHACHWELT - Das Magazin für Schachspieler, September 2009, S. 16/18

References 
Footnotes

Sources
 Chess Classic 2010 (2001 bis 2010) auf Chess Tigers (inklusive Details)
 Historie der Chess Classic in Frankfurt und Mainz (2000 bis 2010) auf  (Tabellen, Partien und Bilder)

Chess in Germany
Chess competitions
1994 in chess
Recurring sporting events established in 1994
Recurring sporting events disestablished in 2010
1994 establishments in Germany
2010 disestablishments in Germany